is a Japanese manga series written and illustrated by Tsurumaikada. It has been serialized in Kodansha's Monthly Afternoon since May 2020, with its chapters collected in seven tankōbon volumes as of December 2022. In North America, the manga is licensed for English release by Kodansha USA.

In 2023, Medalist won the 68th Shogakukan Manga Award for the general category.

Publication
Medalist is written and illustrated by Tsurumaikada. The series began in Kodansha's Monthly Afternoon on May 25, 2020. Kodansha has collected its chapters into individual tankōbon volumes. The first volume was released on September 23, 2020. As of December 22, 2022, seven volumes have been released.

In March 2021, Kodansha USA announced the digital English release of the manga in North America, starting on May 18, 2021.

Volume list

Reception
The series ranked #15 on the "Nationwide Bookstore Employees' Recommended Comics of 2021" by the Honya Club website. The series ranked 16th out of 50 nominees in the 2021 Next Manga Awards in the print category. It was also nominated for and won the award in 2022. The series ranked 30th on the 2021 "Book of the Year" list by Da Vinci magazine; it ranked 23rd on the 2022 list. The series ranked 12th on the Nationwide Bookstore Employees' Recommended Comics of 2022. The series won the 68th Shogakukan Manga Award in the general category in 2023.

References

External links
  
 

Drama anime and manga
Figure skating in anime and manga
Kodansha manga
Seinen manga
Winners of the Shogakukan Manga Award for general manga